Kathleen Camille Muldong Rodriguez (born December 27, 1994) is a Filipino footballer who plays as a midfielder for Kaya and the Philippines women's national team.

Early life and education
Rodriguez was born in Zamboanga City on December 27, 1994. She studied at Miriam College High School for her secondary studies. She attended Ateneo de Manila University for her collegiate studies.

Rodriguez took up the sport of football in 2005. She participated in tournaments organized by the Rizal Football Association (RIFA) and played for Miriam at the Women's National Collegiate Athletic Association (WNCAA). She was named MVP in various RIFA-organized tournaments, mostly 9-a-sides, and was named to the Mythical Selection of the WNCAA from the 39th to the 41st season. She also played in the Palarong Pambansa in 2009 and 2010 for the National Capital Region. She was named MVP in both editions.

College career
Rodriguez played for the Ateneo Lady Blue Booters, the women's football team of the Ateneo de Manila University during her college. She played for the Ateneo in the UAAP with her team finishing third thrice consecutively. She was named best striker in UAAP Season 77 and was part of the "Mythical Eleven" in UAAP Season 79. She was captain of the team by her senior year.

Club career
Rodriguez continued to play for the Ateneo in the PFF Women's League.

International career
Rodriguez played in various youth national teams of the Philippines before earning her first international cap for the senior team in 2011 at age 16 at the 2011 AFF Women's Championship. She scored her first goal in the same tournament against Malaysia in 2011 but later took a break from international duty to focus on her collegiate studies.

Rodriguez returned to national team in 2017, and was part of the squad that competed at the 2017 Southeast Asian Games and the 2018 AFC Women's Asian Cup.

International goals
Scores and results list the Philippines' goal tally first.

Honours

International

Philippines
Southeast Asian Games third place: 2021
AFF Women's Championship: 2022

References

1994 births
Living people
Sportspeople from Zamboanga City
Filipino women's footballers
Women's association football midfielders
Ateneo de Manila University alumni
University Athletic Association of the Philippines footballers
Philippines women's international footballers
Competitors at the 2017 Southeast Asian Games
Competitors at the 2019 Southeast Asian Games
Southeast Asian Games medalists in football
Southeast Asian Games bronze medalists for the Philippines
Competitors at the 2021 Southeast Asian Games